Ghumthang is a village in Sindhupalchok District in the Bagmati Zone of central Nepal. At the time of the 1991 Nepal census it had a population of 3975 and had 760 houses in the village.  The rugged village hit by landslide sep 13 2020, 5 dead, 31 missing following heavy rain.

References

Populated places in Sindhupalchowk District